David Schloffer (born 28 April 1992) is an Austrian professional footballer who plays as an attacking midfielder for FC Gleisdorf 09 in Austrian Regionalliga Central.

Club career
He signed his professional contract with SK Sturm Graz in July 2012.

International career
He made his debut for the Austria U-21 team in 2013.

References

1992 births
Living people
Austrian footballers
Austria under-21 international footballers
Association football midfielders
SK Sturm Graz players
SV Lafnitz players
SV Elversberg players
FSV Wacker 90 Nordhausen players
Austrian Football Bundesliga players
2. Liga (Austria) players
Austrian Regionalliga players
Regionalliga players
Austrian expatriate footballers
Expatriate footballers in Germany
Austrian expatriate sportspeople in Germany